This is a list of artists whose body of work has been described as sunshine pop (also called "soft pop").

A
 The Association

B
 The Bobby Fuller Four
 The Buckinghams

C
 Carpenters
 Cyrkle

E
 Eternity's Children

F
 The Free Design

G
 Gary Lewis & the Playboys
 Gary Puckett & The Union Gap
 The Grass Roots

H
 Harpers Bizarre
 The Hobbits

I
 Los Íberos

L
 The Left Banke

M
 The Mamas & the Papas
 The Merry-Go-Round
 The Millennium
 The Monkees

N
 Roger Nichols & the Small Circle of Friends

P
 Paul Revere & the Raiders
 Peppermint Rainbow
 Peppermint Trolley Company
 Pic-Nic

R
 Johnny Rivers

S
 Sagittarius
 Nancy Sinatra
 Spanky and Our Gang
 Strawberry Alarm Clock

T
 The Turtles
 Twinn Connexion

Y
 Young Rascals

References

Lists of pop musicians
Sunshine pop
California Sound